Estriol sulfamate (developmental code name J1034), or estriol 3-O-sulfamate, is a synthetic estrogen and estrogen ester which was never marketed. It is the C3 sulfamate ester of estriol. The drug shows substantially improved oral estrogenic potency (vagina, uterus) relative to estriol in rats but without an increase in hepatic estrogenic potency. However, the closely related compound estradiol sulfamate (E2MATE) failed to show estrogenic activity in humans, which is due to the fact that it is additionally a highly potent inhibitor of steroid sulfatase which regulates the estrogenicity of such compounds  and thus it prevents its own bioactivation into estradiol.

See also
 List of estrogen esters § Estriol esters

References

Abandoned drugs
Estriol esters
Prodrugs
Sulfamate esters
Synthetic estrogens
Triols